Marbury Country Park is a country park in Cheshire, England.  It lies in the heart of Northwich Community Woodlands, an integral part of the Mersey Forest. Former industrial land is gradually being transformed to create a rich and green environment stretching from Marbury to Northwich.

Many of the features of the Country Park, including the lime avenues and the arboretum, are a legacy of the days when Marbury was a grand estate. The last Marbury Hall, built in the 1850s, was a fine-looking house modelled on the French chateau at Fontainebleau, with an imposing carriage drive entrance.

Originally owned by the Smith-Barry family, the hall became a country club in the 1930s, and then a P.O.W. camp during the Second World War. After this the hall served as a hostel for ICI employees during its considerable post-war expansion and some of the P.O.W. camp huts persisted as accommodation for the workforce. By the 1960s the hall had fallen into disrepair and had to be demolished. The history of the hall was told in a community play in 2002.

The Friends of Anderton and Marbury (FOAM) are a group involved with looking after both parks and organising walks, talks, conservation tasks and events.

See also

Marbury Hall, Anderton with Marbury
Marbury Reedbed Nature Reserve
List of parks and open spaces in Cheshire

References

External links
Discovercheshire website (Marbury Country Park page).
Northwich Woodlands (Discovercheshire).

Parks and open spaces in Cheshire